O Holy Night is an album by American country music artist John Berry. It was released by Patriot Records on September 26, 1995. The album peaked at number 21 on the Billboard Top Country Albums chart.

Track listing

AArranged by Chuck Howard and John Berry.
BThe liner notes erroneously cite "Away in a Manger" as being written by Martin Luther.
CArranged by Jeff Jetton and Chuck Howard.

Personnel
 Greg Barnhill - background vocals
 Eddie Bayers - drums
 Michael Black - background vocals
 John Catchings - cello
 Chad Cromwell - drums
 Connie Ellisor - violin
 Mary Ann Kennedy - background vocals
 Terry McMillan - harmonica, percussion
 Steve Nathan - keyboards, piano
 Michael Rhodes - bass guitar
 Pam Rose - background vocals
 Darrell Scott - background vocals
 Billy Joe Walker Jr. - acoustic guitar
 Biff Watson - acoustic guitar
 John Willis - acoustic guitar, electric guitar
 Glenn Worf - bass guitar

Chart performance

References

1995 Christmas albums
John Berry (country singer) albums
Liberty Records albums
Christmas albums by American artists
Country Christmas albums